The Unknown is a 1915 American silent drama film produced  by Jesse Lasky and distributed by Paramount Pictures. Directed by George Melford, it stars Lou Tellegen, Theodore Roberts, and Dorothy Davenport.

Cast
Lou Tellegen as Richard Farquhar
Theodore Roberts as Captain Destinn
Dorothy Davenport as Nancy Preston
Hal Clements as Captain Arnaud
Tom Forman as First Private
Raymond Hatton as Second Private
Horace B. Carpenter as Hotel Proprietor
George Gebhardt
Lucien Littlefield

Preservation status
A print of this film is preserved in the Library of Congress.

References

External links

1915 films
American silent feature films
Films directed by George Melford
Films based on American novels
Paramount Pictures films
1915 drama films
American black-and-white films
Silent American drama films
Films based on works by I. A. R. Wylie
1910s American films